Gregory William Orr (born 6 August 1954 in Los Angeles) is an American writer and director of documentary and fiction films. He is the son of actress Joy Page and TV producer William T. Orr, and step-grandson of Jack L. Warner, one of the Warner Brothers.

Career
Orr attended Boston University and the California Institute of the Arts, where he studied under film director Alexander Mackendrick.

In 1993 Orr produced his first documentary, Jack L. Warner: The Last Mogul, a feature-length biography of his mother's stepfather, the movie pioneer Jack L. Warner.

Orr's other films include Parole: Prison Without Bars (2000), The Day They Died (2003), Alone (2004, short), and Recreator (2011). As Recreator, later entitled, Cloned: The Recreator Chronicles (2012), marked the filmmaker's debut in feature-length, psychological thrillers, the movie and Orr's creative journey were explored in issue number 62 of Indie Slate magazine, distributed throughout North America and in parts of Australia.

References

External links

American documentary filmmakers
Living people
Boston University alumni
California Institute of the Arts alumni
People from Anaheim, California
1954 births
Film directors from California